Veli Balli (born 10 December 1949) is a Turkish long-distance runner. He competed in the marathon at the 1976 Summer Olympics.

References

1949 births
Living people
Athletes (track and field) at the 1976 Summer Olympics
Turkish male long-distance runners
Turkish male marathon runners
Olympic athletes of Turkey
Place of birth missing (living people)